Pheidole eowilsoni is a species of ant that was discovered and described by John T. Longino in 2009. It was named in honor of E. O. Wilson. It occurs in Central America.

References

eowilsoni
Insects described in 2009
Hymenoptera of North America